is a wagashi (Japanese confection) made with glutinous rice, regular rice (ratio of 7:3, or only glutinous rice), and sweet azuki paste (red bean paste). They are made by soaking the rice for approximately 1 hour. The rice is then cooked, and a thick azuki paste is hand-packed around pre-formed balls of rice. Botamochi is eaten as sacred food as offering during the weeks of the spring and the autumn Higan in Japan.

The two different names are, some people say, derived from the Botan (peony) which blooms in the spring and the Hagi (Japanese bush clover or Lespedeza) which blooms during autumn.

Botamochi is the modern name for the dish kaimochi (かいもち) mentioned in the Heian Period text Uji Shūi Monogatari (宇治拾遺物語).

The proverb , literally "a botamochi falls down from a shelf", means "receiving a windfall", "a lucky break".

The term is also used for a specific pattern of Bizen ware with two, three or five round marks, as if the marks of the small balls of rice cakes were left on the plate.

See also

 Higan
 Mochi

References

Wagashi